Watervliet Junior-Senior High School is a public high school located in Watervliet, Albany County, New York, U.S.A., and is the only high school operated by the Watervliet City School District.

Footnotes

Schools in Albany County, New York
Public high schools in New York (state)